Universal Alcorn Charter Elementary School is a charter school located in the Grays Ferry neighborhood of Philadelphia, Pennsylvania. It is located in the historic James Alcorn School building. The building was designed by Irwin T. Catharine and built in 1931–1932. It is a three-story, nine bay, yellow brick building on a raised basement in the Late Gothic Revival-style. It features two projecting entrances with stone surrounds, a central entrance with arched opening, a two-story projecting bay window, and a crenellated parapet.

The building was added to the National Register of Historic Places in 1988.

References

External links

School buildings on the National Register of Historic Places in Philadelphia
Gothic Revival architecture in Pennsylvania
School buildings completed in 1932
South Philadelphia
Public elementary schools in Philadelphia
Charter schools in Pennsylvania
1932 establishments in Pennsylvania